Sarah Togatuki (born 14 October 1997) is an Australian rugby league footballer who plays as a er for the Sydney Roosters in the NRL Women's Premiership and for the St Marys Saints in the NSWRL Women's Premiership.

She is a Samoan and New South Wales representative.

Background
Born in Auburn, New South Wales, Togatuki began playing rugby league for the Glenmore Park Brumbies.

Playing career
In 2018, Togatuki joined the Sydney Roosters NRL Women's Premiership team. In Round 1 of the 2018 NRL Women's season, she made her debut for the Roosters in a 4–10 loss to the New Zealand Warriors. On 30 September 2018, she came off the bench in the Roosters Grand Final loss to the Brisbane Broncos.

On 6 October 2018, she represented the Prime Minister's XIII in their 40–4 win over Papua New Guinea.

In May 2019, she represented NSW City at the Women's National Championships. In July 2019, she joined the St George Illawarra Dragons NRLW team but did not play a game for the club.

In September 2020, Togatuki rejoined the Roosters NRLW team.

On 13 November 2020, she made her debut for New South Wales in a 18–24 loss to Queensland at Sunshine Coast Stadium.

References

External links
Sydney Roosters profile
Samoa profile
Australia PMXIII profile

1997 births
Living people
Australian sportspeople of Samoan descent
Australian female rugby league players
Samoa women's national rugby league team players
Rugby league second-rows
Sydney Roosters (NRLW) players